Bryan Adams. The Bare Bones Tour. Live at Sydney Opera House is a live album and DVD/Blu-ray by Canadian musician Bryan Adams. The album was recorded live at the Sydney Opera House.

It is available as a CD/DVD set, or separately as a CD, DVD or Blu-ray.

Track listing

CD

DVD/Blu-ray

Certifications

References

Bryan Adams albums
Live video albums
2013 live albums
2013 video albums
Polydor Records live albums
Polydor Records video albums
Albums recorded at the Sydney Opera House
Concert films